Carl Fredrik Bergström (born 9 July 1990) is a Swedish competitive sailor.

Bergström was born in Onsala, and represents the Royal Swedish Yacht Club (Kungliga Svenska Segel Sällskapet, KSSS). He competed at the 2016 Summer Olympics in Rio de Janeiro, in the men's 470, where he finished in 6th place with partner Anton Dahlberg. At the 2020 Summer Olympics, he and Dalberg won a silver medal. in the men's 470.

References

External links
 
 
 

1990 births
Living people
Swedish male sailors (sport)
Olympic sailors of Sweden
Sailors at the 2016 Summer Olympics – 470
Sailors at the 2020 Summer Olympics – 470
Medalists at the 2020 Summer Olympics
Olympic medalists in sailing
Olympic silver medalists for Sweden